The Wanderer is the eighth studio album by American singer-songwriter Donna Summer, released on October 20, 1980. It marks a musical departure for Summer, being an album influenced by rock and new wave whilst previous albums all fell under the disco music category. Her inaugural release of the Geffen Records label, it became a Top 20 album in the United States, with the title track reaching No. 3 on the Billboard Hot 100; other singles failed to enter the top ten. However, the record was more unsuccessful on the charts than her previous album Bad Girls, which topped the Billboard 200 for five weeks.

This album had been out of print, but was re-released on December 9, 2014 on the Driven by the Music label with remastered and bonus tracks, alongside all her other albums released during the 1980s (excluding She Works Hard for the Money). A reissue was released for purchasing and streaming for the 40th anniversary of the album on October 16, 2020. It features the original tracks and seven additional remix tracks.

The album sold over 600,000 copies in the United States.

Background and release
Summer had made her name the previous decade as the most successful female artist of the disco genre, releasing a vast selection of hit singles and albums on Casablanca Records. During this period however, Summer had felt that the label had exploited her and made her portray a sexually orientated image ("The First Lady of Love") with which she never felt comfortable. The label had also taken over other elements of Summer's personal life, to the point where she felt she had no control over her life or career. Having come out of a period of depression and rediscovering her Christian faith, Summer had made the decision to break away from Casablanca and file a lawsuit against them. After leaving Casablanca, Summer became the first artist to be signed to the newly established Geffen Records.

By 1980, banners reading "disco sucks" were seen everywhere and disco records became flops. Summer decided to leave the disco sound behind. The album was co-written and produced by Giorgio Moroder and Pete Bellotte, who had produced the vast majority of Summer's hits since their partnership with her began in 1974. Production for The Wanderer was rushed; Geffen wanted to get new product out because of Casablanca's plans to release Walk Away, another greatest hits collection. "We would have liked to do more tweaking, and have more time for production. But we just had to let it go," said Harold Faltermeyer about the recording of the album.

"Cold Love" gained Summer a Grammy nomination for Best Female Rock Vocal Performance. Summer's rediscovered Christian faith was documented in the gospel song "I Believe in Jesus", for which she also received a nomination for Best Inspirational Performance. As a child Summer had sung in gospel choirs, so this song was a chance for her to go back to her roots.

Critical and commercial reception

The album peaked at number 13 on the Billboard Album Chart – selling 600,000 copies in the US – and the title track hit number 3 on the US singles chart. However, two follow-up singles – "Cold Love" and "Who Do You Think You're Foolin'" – barely reached the Top 40. The album and its singles attained limited success on the UK charts. None of the singles cracked the UK Top 40. Critics, however, were largely positive. Village Voice rock critic Robert Christgau wrote, "She loves a good hook the way she loves her own child. And you can (still) dance to her." Bil Carpenter in his review for AllMusic website gave the album four and a half stars out of five and elected  "Cold Love" and "Night Life" as the best songs of the album.

Track listing

Personnel 
 Donna Summer – lead vocals
 Harold Faltermeyer – keyboards, synthesizers, arrangements (1-6, 8, 10)
 Sylvester Levay – keyboards, synthesizers, arrangements (7, 9)
 Jeff Baxter – guitars 
 Steve Lukather – guitars
 Tim May – guitars
 Les Hurdle – bass 
 John Pierce – bass 
 Leland Sklar – bass
 Keith Forsey – drums, percussion
 Gary Herbig – saxophone solo
 Trevor Veitch – musical contractor
 Bill Champlin – backing vocals (1, 2, 3, 5-10)
 Carmen Grillo – backing vocals (1, 2, 3, 5-10)
 Tom Kelly – backing vocals (1, 2, 3, 5-10)
 Stephanie Spruill – backing vocals (4)

Production 
 Pete Bellotte – producer, mixing 
 Giorgio Moroder – producer, mixing 
 Harold Faltermeyer – engineer, mixing 
 Jürgen Koppers – engineer, mixing 
 Brian Reeves – engineer 
 Ken Perry – mastering at A&M Studios (Hollywood, California)
 Laurie Kanner – production coordinator 
 Donna Summer – album concept 
 Christopher Whorf – design 
 Martin Donald – lettering 
 Harry Langdon Jr. – photography

Charts

Certifications and sales

References

1980 albums
Donna Summer albums
Albums produced by Giorgio Moroder
Albums produced by Pete Bellotte
Geffen Records albums